A village is a classification of municipalities used in the Canadian province of British Columbia.  British Columbia's Lieutenant Governor in Council may incorporate a community as a village by letters patent, under the recommendation of the Minister of Communities, Sport and Cultural Development, if its population is not greater than 2,500 and the outcome of a vote involving affected residents was that greater than 50% voted in favour of the proposed incorporation.

British Columbia has 42 villages that had a cumulative population of 44,962 and an average population of 1,070 in the 2011 Census. British Columbia's largest and smallest villages are Cumberland and Zeballos with populations of 3,398 and 125 respectively.

Of British Columbia's current 42 villages, the first to incorporate as a village was Kaslo on August 14, 1893, while the most recent community to incorporate as a village was Queen Charlotte on December 5, 2005 (later renamed to Daajing Giids on July 13, 2022).

List 

Notes:

Former villages 
Fort Nelson held village status between April 8, 1971, and October 31, 1987, after which it was classified as a town before ultimately amalgamating with the Northern Rockies Regional District on February 6, 2009, to form the Northern Rockies Regional Municipality.

Kinnaird held village status between August 6, 1947, and August 5, 1967, after which it was classified as a town before ultimately amalgamating with the Town of Castlegar on January 1, 1974, to form the City of Castlegar.

Mission City held village status between December 12, 1939, and January 1, 1958, after which it was classified as a town before ultimately amalgamating with the District of Mission on November 1, 1969.

Town status eligibility 
As of the 2021 Census, two of the above villages – Cumberland and Pemberton – meet the requirement of having a population greater than 2,500 to incorporate as a town.

See also 
List of communities in British Columbia
List of municipalities in British Columbia
List of cities in British Columbia
List of district municipalities in British Columbia
List of towns in British Columbia

References 

villages B